The CWS T-1 was the first serially-built car manufactured in Poland.  A series of different cars based on the T-1 chassis designed by Tadeusz Tański (hence T-1) of the Centralne Warsztaty Samochodowe (hence CWS), it was the only motor car that could be completely dismantled and put together again with one tool, since all its screws and bolts had the same diameter.

In 1927 serial production for CWS T-1 started.

Although the car was designed in 1922, it was not until 1925 the prototype tests were completed. Between 1925 and 1932 approximately 800 CWS T-1 were manufactured in a variety of versions. Among them were;
 Torpedo (open-top)
 Kareta (Hardtop)
 Berlina (Sedan)
 Cabriolet (in fact a semi-convertible)
 pick-up
 van

In 1930, the CWS works were absorbed by the Polish state-controlled industrial giant PZInż, yet the production was continued under the previous name. However, in 1932, a license for the Polski Fiat was purchased from Italy and the Italian head of the Fiat holding demanded that the sale of CWS cars be stopped. The Polish authorities obeyed and the CWS-1 was withdrawn from production.

References

External links
 Photo of CWS display at Poznan show
 CWS Poland's First Series Produced Automobiles - history and pictures (English)

Science and technology in Poland
Cars of Poland